Barry John Salvage (21 December 1948 – 14 October 1986) was an English professional footballer who played in the Football League for Brentford, Millwall, Queens Park Rangers and Fulham as a left winger. He later became a manager in Norway.

Career

Eastbourne United 
A winger, Salvage began his career at Athenian League Second Division club Eastbourne United. He won promotion to the First Division in 1967 and departed the club in September that year.

Fulham 
Salvage moved up to the Football League to join First Division club Fulham in September 1967. He had five appearances during a disastrous 1967–68 season for the Cottagers, which saw the club relegated to Second Division with a bottom-place finish. Salvage made just two appearances during the 1968–69 season and departed Fulham in March 1969. He made just seven appearances during his two years at Craven Cottage.

Millwall 
Salvage moved across London to sign for Second Division club Millwall in March 1969. He had a torrid time with the Lions, making just two appearances before departing at the end of the 1969–70 season.

Queens Park Rangers 
Salvage moved back to West London to join Second Division club Queens Park Rangers in March 1971. He failed to break through into the first team, making 24 appearances and scoring one goal before departing in February 1973.

Brentford 
Salvage dropped down to the Third Division to sign for Brentford for a £9,000 fee in February 1973. He had a good start to his time at Griffin Park, scoring on his debut in a 5–0 rout of Port Vale and later that month he scored one of the fastest goals in club history, after just 24 seconds of a match versus Charlton Athletic. He made 16 appearances and scored three goals in which remained of the 1972–73 season, but could not prevent the Bees suffering relegation to the Fourth Division. He established himself in the first team over the following two seasons, making 76 appearances and scoring five goals, but Brentford remained rooted in the Fourth Division. Salvage departed the Bees at the end of the 1974–75 season, having made 91 appearances and scored eight goals during his time at Griffin Park.

Return to Millwall 
Salvage returned to Millwall in August 1975. Now playing Third Division football, he banished the memories of his previous spell with the club by making 42 appearances, scoring six goals and helping the Lions to secure promotion to the Second Division with a third-place finish. Salvage's appearance-count dropped to 20 in the Second Division and he was released at the end of the 1976–77 season. Salvage made 67 appearances and scored 10 goals during his two spells at The Den.

St. Louis Stars 
Salvage moved to the United States in 1977 to sign for North American Soccer League club St. Louis Stars. He made 25 appearances and scored one goal as the Stars fell to the Rochester Lancers in the first round of the 1977 playoffs.

Later career 
Following a brief spell with Southern League Premier Division club Hastings United, Salvage moved to Norway in 1979 and played for lower league clubs Åkra, Kopervik and Haugar. He took the name "Berdines Salvanes" while with Åkra. After returning from Norway, Salvage played for both Eastbourne United and Eastbourne Town, scoring seven goals in 21 appearances for the latter.

Managerial career 
While with Åkra, Kopervik and Haugar in Norway, Salvage combined his playing duties with that of the clubs' manager.

Personal life 
Salvage died in Eastbourne, East Sussex, as a result of a heart attack while competing in a charity run on 14 October 1986. He was only 39 years old.

Career statistics

Honours 
Åkra
 4. divisjon: 1979

References

1948 births
1986 deaths
Footballers from Bristol
English footballers
Association football wingers
Eastbourne United F.C. players
Eastbourne Town F.C. players
Fulham F.C. players
Millwall F.C. players
Queens Park Rangers F.C. players
Brentford F.C. players
St. Louis Stars (soccer) players
SK Haugar players
Hastings United F.C. (1948) players
English Football League players
North American Soccer League (1968–1984) players
Norwegian First Division players
English football managers
SK Haugar managers
English expatriate footballers
English expatriate football managers
English expatriate sportspeople in the United States
English expatriate sportspeople in Norway
Expatriate football managers in Norway
Expatriate soccer players in the United States
Expatriate footballers in Norway